Leonid Pilunsky (15 September 1947 – 21 November 2021) was a Ukrainian-Crimean politician.

Biography
A member of the People's Movement of Ukraine, he served in the Verkhovna Rada of Crimea from 2006 to 2014, when the territory was annexed by Russia.

Pilunsky died on 21 November 2021, in Crimea, after suffering from COVID-19. He was 74 years old.

References

1947 births
2021 deaths
21st-century Ukrainian politicians
People's Movement of Ukraine politicians
Politicians from Simferopol
Deaths from the COVID-19 pandemic in Ukraine
Deaths from the COVID-19 pandemic in Russia